San Bernardino is a mountainous village in the canton of Grisons in Switzerland. It is the southern entry point to the San Bernardino tunnel, which complemented the road over the San Bernardino Pass in 1967, opening a new all-year-round road to crossing the Alps.

The village is part of the municipality of Mesocco. The language spoken is Italian, one of the three official languages in the canton of Graubünden.

The church dates from around 1450, only years before the Viamala gorge bridge was opened for traffic, multiplying traffic across the pass.

Traffic 

The old Mulattiera is still visible and in good condition, this was the path for horses before the construction of a road in 1770 by the adjacent municipalities. In 1812 the state (or canton) of Graubünden built a new road that is actually the one still in use for local traffic and across the pass, whereas the tunnel traffic uses a newly built road that avoids serpentines to allow a fluent traffic.

The walls were built then as dry walls and were restored in 1995 because the road has still to work as a replacement for the tunnel if it has to be closed. The restoration was completed with a minimum amount of concrete reinforcements.

Geography 
 
Lagh Doss is located close to the village.
The municipality encloses Val Curciusa, a valley lying north of Bocchetta di Curciusa and therefore emptying its waters towards the Rhine river and the North Sea instead of the Adriatic Sea as in most Italian spoken areas of the canton of Graubünden.

Weather

References

External links

  San Bernardino on Graubünden Ferien, official tourism board for holidays in switzerland in this area.

Mesocco
Villages in Switzerland
Villages in Graubünden
Ski areas and resorts in Switzerland